Filesio Cittadini was a Roman Catholic prelate who served as Bishop of Muro Lucano (1562–1571).

Biography
On 6 July 1562, Filesio Cittadini was appointed Bishop of Muro Lucano by Pope Pius IV.
He served as Bishop of Muro Lucano until his resignation on 16 November 1571.

References

External links and additional sources
 (for Chronology of Bishops) 
 (for Chronology of Bishops) 

15th-century Italian Roman Catholic bishops
Bishops appointed by Pope Pius IV